The Himalayan Arc: Journeys East of South-east is an anthology of fiction and nonfiction edited by Namita Gokhale, with contributions by authors from the region Gokhale has described as "the bend of the Himalayas, the East of South-east, including Nepal, Bhutan, north-east India, and Myanmar."

Background 
This book, with more than thirty authors contributing to it, is an attempt to depict the sense of shared existence and cultural connectivity between the people residing in the Himalayan region. Along with photos, fables, and folk stories, it features articles on topics such as strategy and diplomacy, espionage, and the deep state.

List of contributors 

 Janice Pariat
 Salil Tripathi
 Ma Thida
 Indra Bahadur Rai
 Prajwal Parajuly
 David Malone (independent filmmaker) 
 Chetan Raj Shrestha
 Kanak Mani Dixit
 Sujeev Shakya
 Pushpesh Pant
 John Elliott (historian) 
 Amish Raj Mulmi
 Thomas Bell
 Sushma Joshi
 Sanjoy Hazarika
 Sudhindra Sharma
 Tsering Tashi
 Abhay K.
 Manoj Joshi (journalist)
 Catherine Anderson
 Andrew Duff 
 Binodini
 Jacqueline Zote
 Aruni Kashyap 
 Sameer Tanti
 Nitoo Das
 Lutfa Hanum Selima Begum
 Uddipana Goswami
 Robin Ngangom
 Akhu Chingangbam
 Indira Goswami
 Andrew Selth
 Tulsi Badrinath
 Meghna Pant
 Mamang Dai
 Desmond Kharmawphlang

Reception 
In his review for The Hindu, Bangladeshi journalist Abdus Salam writes, "The volume ticks all boxes, covering most of the region, opening with Nepal and going all the way to Myanmar. There’s even poetry and colonial-era photographs thrown in. But in the absence of an overarching theme other than geography, the information is discrete and unconnected, an assemblage of vignettes that doesn’t add up to a big picture."

Prannay Pathak of the Hindustan Times writes, "The book is an unprecedented attempt to shed a geopolitical light on a stretch of land, a region that has so far been imagined as having a curiously singular identity, which ceases to exist beyond political borders. However, experiences from the arc transcend any sort of boundaries, and change of culture, practices, beliefs, and language is fluid."

Writing for Outlook Traveller, Vivek Mukherji in his review suggests that the book, "Despite the vastly different subcultures tucked within the folds of the Himalayan ranges, the book is a testament to the interconnectedness of its many warm communities." In a review published in The News Lens, Omair Ahmad writes, "These histories have largely been forgotten in favor of the lines drawn on the map by the British Empire and its successors, but they have re-emerged, and have to be understood, if we are to understand the complex political geography of the region."

References 

Books about Nepal
Travel books
Books about Bhutan
Books about India
Books about Myanmar
2018 books
Books about geopolitics
Geography books